Ethyl octanoate, also known as ethyl caprylate, is a fatty acid ester formed from caprylic acid and ethanol. A colorless liquid at room temperature, it has the semi-developed formula of CH3(CH2)6COOCH2CH3, and is used in food industries as a flavoring and in the perfume industry as a scent additive. It is present in many fruits and alcoholic beverages, and has a strong odor of fruit and flowers. It is used in the creation of synthetic fruity scents.

Synthesis 
Ethyl octanoate can be synthesized from caprylic acid and ethanol via a classic Fischer–Speier esterification.

CH3(CH2)6COOH + CH3CH2OH <=> CH3(CH2)6COOCH2CH3 + H2O

Equilibrium can be shifted towards the right side of the equation through removal of water.

Uses 
Ethyl octanoate does not see widespread use due to the greater availability of reasonably similar esters such as ethyl acetate. However, there are certain applications where it fills a niche. Ethyl octanoate has a strong odor of fruit and flowers and a taste of apricot, and as such it can be used as a flavoring or to create scents. It sees some use as a cleaning agent.

Ethyl octanoate also sees incidental use. It is found in some wines, where overall ester concentration and composition is considered important to the flavor and aroma profile.

Safety 
Like many esters, ethyl octanoate is not considered to be toxic. LD50 in rats is 25.96 g/kg. Though it has a low explosive limit of only 0.67 vol%, it is also weakly volatile, with a vapor pressure of only 0.2 mbar at room temperature. Ethyl octanoate is combustible.

References

Octanoate esters
Ethyl esters